The Duke of Mount Deer is a Hong Kong television series adapted from Louis Cha's novel The Deer and the Cauldron. It was first aired on TVB in Hong Kong in 1998.

Synopsis
Wai Siu Bo is the son of a prostitute who works in a brothel in Yangzhou. After joining the Heaven and Earth society he heads to the Capital and gets enrolled into the service of the Grand Eunuchs. There he becomes friends with the young emperor Hong Hei (Wai mistakes the emperor as another young eunuch) and falls in love with the emperor's younger sister, Princess Kin Ning. His adventures in the Forbidden City leads him into discovering the empress dowager as an impostor; finding several volumes of the prized 42 Chapters which contains the location of a treasure cave; helps the emperor kill the baddie courtier, Lord Obai; and see his position rise from humble eunuch to a grand courtier and confidante of the emperor.

Cast
 Note: Some of the characters' names are in Cantonese romanisation.

 Jordan Chan as Wai Siu-bo
 Steven Ma as Hong-hei Emperor
 Rain Lau as Princess Kin-ning
 Cherie Chan as Seung-yee
 Vivien Leung as Ah-or, Chan Yuen-yuen
 Michelle Fung as So Chuen
 Hilary Tsui as Fong Yee
 Chan On-kei as Tsang Yau
 May Kwong as Muk Kim-ping
 Law Koon-lan as Wai Chun-fa
 Ching Hor-wai as Empress Dowager
 Ku Feng as Hoi Tai-fu
 Ricky Wong as Oboi
 Kwan Hoi-san as Chan Man-leung, Chan Kwong
 Lau Kong as Prince Hong
 Danny Summer as Chan Kan-nam
 Pau Fong as Hung On-tung
 Celine Ma as Mo Tung-chu
 Wong Wai as Ng Sam-kwai
 Mark Kwok as Cheng Hak-song
 Andy Tai as Ng Ying-hung
 Law Ho-kai as Songgotu
 Wilson Tsui as To-lung
 Tang Ying-man as Cheung Hon-nin
 Yeung Tsi-to as Chiu Chai-yin
 Joe Junior as Tong Yeuk-mong
 Peter Lai as Ming-chu
 Wah Chung-nam as Lei Tsi-sing
 Kwong Tso-fai as See Long
 Chan Chung-kin as Suksaha
 Lee Kong-lung as Ng Luk-kei
 Cheng Ka-sang as Tsui Tin-chuen
 Chan Wing-chun as Fung Tsai-chung
 Choi Kwok-hing as Chin Lo-bun
 Yu Tin-wai as Taoist Yuen-tsing
 Sit Chun-kei as Kwan Fu-tsi
 Fong Kit as Ko Yin-chiu
 Cheung Chun-wah as Ka Lo-luk
 Chan Tik-hak as Chung Chi-ling
 Che Po-law as Fat Monk
 Wong Chun-hong as Thin Monk
 Cheung Hon-ban as Luk Ko-suen
 Lee Ka-keung as Muk Kim-shing
 Lok Tat-wah as Lau Yat-chow
 Tang Yu-wing as Ah-see-ha
 Leo Tsang as Muk-lei-ma
 Wong Sing-seung as Pan-po-yee-sin
 Ho Pik-kin as Kang Ching-chung
 Au Ngok as Seung Ho-hei
 Kiu Hung as Ng Chi-wing
 Wong Man-piu as Officer Ha
 Chan On-ying as To Hung-ying
 Yau Wai-chan as Lau Yin
 Irene Wong as Tsui-cho
 Siu Cheuk-yiu as Sui Tung
 Lee Wong-sang as Wai Hak
 Yau Biu as Leung Kau
 Ng Man-sang as Siu-kwai-tsi
 Tong Chun-ming as Wan Yau-to
 Leung Chiu-ho as Wan Yau-fong
 Mak Tsi-wan as See Chung
 Cheng Lui as Taoist Mo-kan
 Lee Tsi-kei as Yan Kam
 Cheung Hung-cheung as Hui Wan-ting
 Ling Hon as Cheung Tam-yuet
 Leung Kin-pin as Cheung Lo-sam
 Wong Wai-tak as Pak Hon-chung
 Lee Wai-man as Pak Hon-fung
 Wong Tin-chak as Lo Yat-fung
 Wong Chi-wai as Pa-long-sing
 Pok Kwan as Yeung Yat-chi
 Lai Suen as Mrs Cheng
 Kwok Tak-shun as Fung Sek-fan
 Lilly Li as Kau-nan
 Cheung Kwok-keung as Shun-chi Emperor
 Sun Kwai-hing as Master Yuk-lam
 Tam Yat-ching as Ching-kwong
 Yu Tze-ming as Ching-koon
 Tam Chuen-hing as Ching-tung
 Toi Siu-man as Ching-sam
 Ma Kim-kwong as Ching-sek
 Chun Hung as Hang-tin
 Lee Chi-wah as Ching-bun
 Lee Chi-wai as Ching-ching
 To Shek-man as Lau Tai-hung
 Cho Kei as Ng Lap-san
 Chun Wong as Mau Sap-bat
 Wong Sun as Chong Wan-sing
 Shek Wan as Sze-to Pak-lui
 Man Kit-wan as Third Mistress Chong
 Hung Tsi-hoi as Sung-tsing Emperor
 Lui Kon-man as Pan-to
 Wong Siu-lung as Chai Yuen-hoi
 Yu Ying-ho as Tang Ping-chun
 Yau Man-shing as Galdan Boshugtu Khan
 Lee Hung-kit as Master Pa-ngan
 Hui See-man as Shaman's wife
 Law Kwan-tso as Desi Sangye Gyatso
 Leung Chung as Fung Nan-tik
 Chan Chi-hung as Master Hoi-chung
 Kwok Cheuk-wah as Hon-tit-mo
 Wan Yu-hung as Man Kwan
 Yip Chun-shing as Lam Hing-chu
 Ho Kwok-wing as Ko-lei-chun
 Lau Hiu-tong as Sophia Alekseyevna
 Koo Ming-wah as Chiu Leung-tung
 Ngai Wai-man as Cheung Yung
 Tang Yu-chiu as Wong Chun-bo
 Cheung Hak as Suen See-hak
 Law Kong as Kwai Sun-shu
 Law Lan as Kwai Yee-neung
 Chan Min-leung as Kwai Chung

External links
 The Duke of Mount Deer official page on TVB's website

1998 Hong Kong television series debuts
1998 Hong Kong television series endings
TVB dramas
Works based on The Deer and the Cauldron
Hong Kong wuxia television series
Television series set in the Qing dynasty
Television shows based on works by Jin Yong